Brekkerista Ridge is a ridge  northeast of the summit of Jutulrora Mountain (separated by Gangbrekka Pass) in the Sverdrup Mountains of Queen Maud Land. It was plotted from air photos by the Third German Antarctic Expedition (1938–39). It was remapped by Norwegian cartographers from surveys and air photos by the Norwegian–British–Swedish Antarctic Expedition (1949–52) and from air photos by the Norwegian expedition (1958–59) and named "Brekkerista" (the "slope ridge").

See also
Ottehallet Slope

References 

Ridges of Queen Maud Land
Princess Martha Coast